The Saigon International University (SIU) is Vietnam's first international private university located in Ho Chi Minh City. SIU is a member of The Group of Asian International Education - an educational and scientific research group in Vietnam.

History 

In 2006, the founding members of SIU submitted a project of establishing an international private university in Ho Chi Minh City to Ho Chi Minh City Department of Education and Training, Ho Chi Minh City People's Committee, The Ministry of Education and Training of VietNam and the Prime Minister’s office.

On September 24, 2007, the Prime Minister signed a decision on the establishment of SIU, offering bachelor and diploma programs in the fields of economics, technical science and language.

Academic profile 

SIU offers bachelor, diploma and diploma to bachelor programs in the fields of economics, technical science and language.

Fields of study:

Business Administration (Majors in Business Administration, Marketing, International Business, Foreign Trade, Tourism Management, Hospitality Management)

Computer Science (Majors in Computer Science, Software Engineering)

English Language

The programs of SIU are recognized by Vietnamese Ministry of Education and Training. Students who follow the program taught in English language will be accepted to transfer to SIU's partner universities for the last two years to complete their bachelor's degree. Graduates of SIU will be eligible to pursue further education to earn an MA or a PhD at other universities in the United States, the UK, Australia, Canada etc.
SIU has collaborated with universities such as: Suffolk University - Boston - United States, Truman State University - Missouri - United States, EF Education First - Boston - United States, Ritsumeikan University and Asia Pacific University - Japan, Buckinghamshire New University - the UK.

Facilities 

SIU owns 3 campuses, Lewis Campus, Fleming Campus and Dong A Campus located in Thao Dien Ward, Dist.2, Ho Chi Minh City with the total area of nearly 9,000 m2 including a swimming pool, facilities for teaching, learning and relaxation such as wireless Internet, library resources, e-library, laboratories, meeting halls, lecture halls, theaters, classrooms, film studio, music room, multi - purpose play field, gym, theatre, relax areas and much more.

In addition, SIU built a 5-ha traditional park in Xuan Tan Commune, Long Khanh Town, Dong Nai Province which has been in operation since November 2012.

SIU traditional park serves as a place for graduation ceremonies, traditional and cultural education and outdoor activities.

Library system 

SIU library  plays an important part in the school's organization. It's considered to be the second learning area for students, where students, lecturers and staff can find various materials and diverse information. It greatly contributes to improving teaching quality at the university.

SIU library has textbooks, reference books, bachelor's theses, scientific research works, dictionaries and magazines…which are neatly and logically arranged. They are also cataloged into different specific areas including: Textbooks, Economics and Business, Computer Science, Dictionary, Fiction, Culture - Tourism, Magazines, etc..

The e-library is run effectively with a modern computer system, high tech equipment and high speed Internet access. The enormous material sources best serve the demands of students, professors and staff, including e-documents, audio files, videos and photos…

International recognition 

SIU is an educational member of The International Assembly for Collegiate Business Education (IACBE) - United States, which has granted candidacy status for The Department of Business and Tourism Management at The SIU.
SIU is also a member of The Association to Advance Collegiate Schools of Business (AACSB) - United States, but not accredited by this organization.

External links 
Website of The Asian International School: http://www.asianschool.edu.vn/en-us/
Website of The Saigon International University: http://www.siu.edu.vn/en-us/
Website of SIU Review: http://review.siu.edu.vn
Website of The Institute of Asian Studies: http://ias.com.vn
Website of The International Assembly for Collegiate Business Education IACBE – United States: http://www.iacbe.org
Website of The Association to Advance Collegiate Schools of Business AACSB – United States: https://www.aacsb.net

Notes 

Universities in Ho Chi Minh City
Educational institutions established in 2007
2007 establishments in Vietnam